Jean-Marc Alexandre (born 24 August 1986) is a Haitian international footballer who last played for Hang Yuen in the Taiwan Football Premier League, as a midfielder.

Career

Youth and College
Born in Verrettes, Haiti, Alexandre grew up Delray Beach, Florida, attended Atlantic High School, and played college soccer at Lynn University. During his collegiate years he also played in the USL Premier Development League with Palm Beach Pumas and Ventura County Fusion.

Professional
Alexandre was drafted in the first round (12th overall) in the 2009 MLS SuperDraft by Real Salt Lake. He made his professional debut on 28 March 2009, coming on as a substitute in RSL's game against Seattle Sounders. After a 2–0 victory over the Vancouver Whitecaps in June 2011, Alexandre was named Player of the Week after scoring his first goal and first career assist in MLS.

Alexandre was traded by Salt Lake to San Jose Earthquakes on 1 December 2011 in exchange for a first round pick in the 2012 MLS Supplemental Draft.

San Jose sent Alexandre to USL Pro club Orlando City on 7 June 2012 for a two-match loan deal. He was re-loaned to Orlando City again on 6 July on a second two-match loan.

He signed for Malaysian club Negeri Sembilan FA in 2014.

On 1 March 2018, he signed for Taiwanese club Hang Yuen.

International
Alexandre is a full international for Haiti, having played in three friendlies in 2008, starting against Honduras, and coming off the bench against Trinidad & Tobago twice.

Honours

Club 
Orlando City SC
 USL (1): 2013

References

External links
 
 

1986 births
Living people
Haiti international footballers
Haitian footballers
Haitian expatriate footballers
Haitian expatriate sportspeople in Malaysia
Lynn Fighting Knights men's soccer players
Palm Beach Pumas players
People from Artibonite (department)
Ventura County Fusion players
Real Salt Lake players
Austin Aztex FC players
San Jose Earthquakes players
Orlando City SC (2010–2014) players
Negeri Sembilan FA players
Fort Lauderdale Strikers players
USL League Two players
Major League Soccer players
USL First Division players
USL Championship players
North American Soccer League players
2009 CONCACAF Gold Cup players
2013 CONCACAF Gold Cup players
2015 CONCACAF Gold Cup players
Copa América Centenario players
Expatriate soccer players in the United States
Haitian expatriate sportspeople in the United States
Sportspeople from Delray Beach, Florida
Real Salt Lake draft picks
Expatriate footballers in Malaysia
Soccer players from Florida
Hang Yuen F.C. players
Expatriate footballers in Taiwan
Haitian expatriate sportspeople in Taiwan
Association football midfielders